N. Peethambara Kurup (born 24 May 1942) is an Indian politician who is a member of the Indian National Congress. He has served as a member of Lok Sabha representing Kollam Lok Sabha constituency from 2009 to 2014.

He was born in Navaikulam in the erstwhile Kingdom of Travancore and has completed his B.A. and LL.B. from The Kerala Law Academy Law College, Thiruvananthapuram. He was the Vice President of Kerala Pradesh Congress Committee.

He was elected to the Lok Sabha for the first time in the 2009 general election defeating P. Rajendran of the Communist Party of India (Marxist) by a margin of 17531 votes.

He was a teacher in the Kadambattukonam High School and in 1964 resigned to become an active politician. He is known for his oratorical skills and is the author of two books in Malayalam, Kiranangal, a play and Sahithya Dhara, an essay anthology.

Controversies
In 2013, South Indian actress Shwetha Menon alleged that Kurup had molested her while the two were attending a function. Shweta later dropped her complaint against Kurup, after he made a "personal apology" to her hours after FIR was lodged against him.

References

External links 
 

People from Thiruvananthapuram district
India MPs 2009–2014
Living people
Members of the Kerala Legislative Assembly
Malayalam-language writers
1942 births
Indian National Congress politicians from Kerala
Lok Sabha members from Kerala